Jack Stephens was a set decorator. He won an Academy Award and was nominated for another in the category Best Art Direction.

Selected filmography
Stephens won an Academy Award for Best Art Direction and was nominated for another:
Won
 Tess (1979)
Nominated
 The Mission (1986)

Biography
Jack Stephens attended High Wycombe Royal Grammar School (U.K.) from 1925 to 1930.

References

External links

Set decorators
Best Art Direction Academy Award winners
Year of birth missing
People from Chittagong
People educated at the Royal Grammar School, High Wycombe
Possibly living people